El Circulo Mercantil de Ferrol (full name: Circulo Mercantil e Industrial de Ferrol, English: The Merchants and Industrialists’ Circle of Ferrol) is an institution created in 1916, six years after the creation of Ferrol's Chamber of Commerce an Industry. Its first president was William V. Martin (a.k.a.: Guillermo V. Martin, by the Spaniards), British Citizen and British Vice-Consul in Ferrol. This institution was originally designed for the flourishing middle classes of the period.

In the 1970s, it developed into a much broader institution in the valley of Serantes on the outskirts of Ferrol. Its facilities include a sports centre with swimming pools, mini-golf range, and tennis courts.

See also 

 El Casino de Ferrol
 Club Naval de Ferrol.

References

External links 

  The “Circulo Mercantil e Industrial” hosts an important book collection in its library

Multi-sport clubs in Spain
Ferrol, Spain
Tennis venues in Spain
1916 establishments in Spain